Rustam Sharipov (born June 2, 1971) is a Ukrainian gymnast and Olympic champion. He won a gold medal at the 1996 Summer Olympics in Atlanta, representing Ukraine, and also a gold medal for the Unified Team at the 1992 Summer Olympics in Barcelona.

Rustam was born in Dushanbe, Tajik SSR. He became an assistant coach for the Men's Gymnastics team at the University of Oklahoma. In May 2011 he accepted the head coach position at The Ohio State University.

References

Video Interviews
Rustam Sharipov videos on Gymnastike.org

External links

1971 births
Living people
Ukrainian male artistic gymnasts
Soviet male artistic gymnasts
Gymnasts at the 1992 Summer Olympics
Gymnasts at the 1996 Summer Olympics
Olympic gold medalists for Ukraine
Olympic bronze medalists for Ukraine
Olympic gymnasts of Ukraine
Olympic gold medalists for the Unified Team
Olympic gymnasts of the Unified Team
Olympic medalists in gymnastics
Sportspeople from Dushanbe
Ukrainian people of Tajikistani descent
Medalists at the 1996 Summer Olympics
Medalists at the 1992 Summer Olympics
Medalists at the World Artistic Gymnastics Championships
European champions in gymnastics
20th-century Ukrainian people